Libido (colloquial: sex drive) is a person's overall sexual drive or desire for sexual activity. Libido is influenced by biological, psychological, and social factors. Biologically, the sex hormones and associated neurotransmitters that act upon the nucleus accumbens (primarily testosterone and dopamine, respectively) regulate libido in humans. Social factors, such as work and family, and internal psychological factors, such as personality and stress, can affect libido. Libido can also be affected by medical conditions, medications, lifestyle and relationship issues, and age (e.g., puberty). A person who has extremely frequent sexual urges, or a suddenly increased sex drive may be experiencing hypersexuality, while the opposite condition is hyposexuality. In psychoanalytic theory, libido is psychic drive or energy, particularly associated with sexual instinct, but also present in other instinctive desires and drives.

A person may have a desire for sex, but not have the opportunity to act on that desire, or may on personal, moral or religious reasons refrain from acting on the urge. Psychologically, a person's urge can be repressed or sublimated. Conversely, a person can engage in sexual activity without an actual desire for it. Multiple factors affect human sex drive, including stress, illness, pregnancy, and others. A 2001 review found that, on average, men have a higher desire for sex than women.

Sexual desires are often an important factor in the formation and maintenance of intimate relationships in humans. A lack or loss of sexual desire can adversely affect relationships. Changes in the sexual desires of any partner in a sexual relationship, if sustained and unresolved, may cause problems in the relationship. The infidelity of a partner may be an indication that a partner's changing sexual desires can no longer be satisfied within the current relationship. You need to look for the root cause of your discomfort and think of solutions that you could suggest. Problems can arise from disparity of sexual desires between partners, or poor communication between partners of sexual needs and preferences.

There is no widely accepted measure of what is a healthy level for sex desire. Some people want to have sex every day, or more than once a day; others once a year or not at all. However, a person who lacks a desire for sexual activity for some period of time may be experiencing a hypoactive sexual desire disorder or may be asexual.

Psychological perspectives

Psychoanalysis

Sigmund Freud, who is considered the originator of the modern use of the term, defined libido as "the energy, regarded as a quantitative magnitude... of those instincts which have to do with all that may be comprised under the word 'love'." It is the instinctual energy or force, contained in what Freud called the id, the strictly unconscious structure of the psyche. He also explained that it is analogous to hunger, the will to power, and so on insisting that it is a fundamental instinct that is innate in all humans.

Freud developed the idea of a series of developmental phases in which the libido fixates on different erogenous zones—first in the oral stage (exemplified by an infant's pleasure in nursing), then in the anal stage (exemplified by a toddler's pleasure in controlling his or her bowels), then in the phallic stage, through a latency stage in which the libido is dormant, to its reemergence at puberty in the genital stage. (Karl Abraham would later add subdivisions in both oral and anal stages.)

Freud pointed out that these libidinal drives can conflict with the conventions of civilised behavior, represented in the psyche by the superego. It is this need to conform to society and control the libido that leads to tension and disturbance in the individual, prompting the use of ego defenses to dissipate the psychic energy of these unmet and mostly unconscious needs into other forms. Excessive use of ego defenses results in neurosis. A primary goal of psychoanalysis is to bring the drives of the id into consciousness, allowing them to be met directly and thus reducing the patient's reliance on ego defenses.

Freud viewed libido as passing through a series of developmental stages within the individual. Failure to adequately adapt to the demands of these different stages could result in libidinal energy becoming 'dammed up' or fixated in these stages, producing certain pathological character traits in adulthood. Thus the psychopathologized individual for Freud was an immature individual, and the goal of psychoanalysis was to bring these fixations to conscious awareness so that the libido energy would be freed up and available for conscious use in some sort of constructive sublimation.

Karen Horney stated that libido can be revisioned as "emotional drives, impulses, needs or passions" to determine personality psychology.

Analytical psychology
According to Swiss psychiatrist Carl Gustav Jung, the libido is identified as the totality of psychic energy, not limited to sexual desire. As Jung states in "The Concept of Libido," "[libido] denotes a desire or impulse which is unchecked by any kind of authority, moral or otherwise. Libido is appetite in its natural state. From the genetic point of view it is bodily needs like hunger, thirst, sleep, and sex, and emotional states or affects, which constitute the essence of libido." The Duality (opposition) creates the energy (or libido) of the psyche, which Jung asserts expresses itself only through symbols: "It is the energy that manifests itself in the life process and is perceived subjectively as striving and desire." (Ellenberger, 697) These symbols may manifest as "fantasy-images" in the process of psychoanalysis which embody the contents of the libido, otherwise lacking in any definite form. Desire, conceived generally as a psychic longing, movement, displacement and structuring, manifests itself in definable forms which are apprehended through analysis.

Defined more narrowly, libido also refers to an individual's urge to engage in sexual activity, and its antonym is the force of destruction termed mortido or destrudo.

Factors that affect libido

Endogenous compounds 

Libido is governed primarily by activity in the mesolimbic dopamine pathway (ventral tegmental area and nucleus accumbens). Consequently, dopamine and related trace amines (primarily phenethylamine) that modulate dopamine neurotransmission play a critical role in regulating libido.

Other neurotransmitters, neuropeptides, and sex hormones that affect sex drive by modulating activity in or acting upon this pathway include:
 Testosterone (directly correlated) – and other androgens
 Estrogen (directly correlated) – and related female sex hormones
 Progesterone (inversely correlated)
 Oxytocin (directly correlated)
 Serotonin (inversely correlated)
 Norepinephrine (directly correlated)
 Acetylcholine

Sex hormone levels and the menstrual cycle 
A woman's desire for sex is correlated to her menstrual cycle, with many women experiencing a heightened sexual desire in the several days immediately before ovulation, which is her peak fertility period, which normally occurs two days before and until two days after the ovulation. This cycle has been associated with changes in a woman's testosterone levels during the menstrual cycle. According to Gabrielle Lichterman, testosterone levels have a direct impact on a woman's interest in sex. According to her, testosterone levels rise gradually from about the 24th day of a woman's menstrual cycle until ovulation on about the 14th day of the next cycle, and during this period the woman's desire for sex increases consistently. The 13th day is generally the day with the highest testosterone levels. In the week following ovulation, the testosterone level is the lowest and as a result women will experience less interest in sex.

Also, during the week following ovulation, progesterone levels increase, resulting in a woman experiencing difficulty achieving orgasm. Although the last days of the menstrual cycle are marked by a constant testosterone level, women's libido may get a boost as a result of the thickening of the uterine lining which stimulates nerve endings and makes a woman feel aroused. Also, during these days, estrogen levels decline, resulting in a decrease of natural lubrication.

Although some specialists disagree with this theory, menopause is still considered by the majority a factor that can cause decreased sexual desire in women. The levels of estrogen decrease at menopause and this usually causes a lower interest in sex and vaginal dryness which makes sex painful. However, the levels of testosterone increase at menopause and this may be why some women may experience a contrary effect of an increased libido.

Psychological and social factors 
Certain psychological or social factors can reduce the desire for sex. These factors can include lack of privacy or intimacy, stress or fatigue, distraction, or depression. Environmental stress, such as prolonged exposure to elevated sound levels or bright light, can also affect libido. Other causes include experience of sexual abuse, assault, trauma, or neglect, body image issues, and anxiety about engaging in sexual activity.

Individuals with post-traumatic stress disorder (PTSD) may find themselves with reduced sexual desire. Struggling to find pleasure, as well as having trust issues, many with PTSD experience feelings of vulnerability, rage and anger, and emotional shutdowns, which have been shown to inhibit sexual desire in those with PTSD. Reduced sex drive may also be present in trauma victims due to issues arising in sexual function. For women, it has been found that treatment can improve sexual function, thus helping restore sexual desire. Depression and libido decline often coincide, with reduced sex drive being one of the symptoms of depression. Those with depression often report the decline in libido to be far reaching and more noticeable than other symptoms. In addition, those with depression often are reluctant to report their reduced sex drive, often normalizing it with cultural/social values, or by the failure of the physician to inquire about it.

Physical factors 
Physical factors that can affect libido include endocrine issues such as hypothyroidism, the effect of certain prescription medications (for example flutamide), and the attractiveness and biological fitness of one's partner, among various other lifestyle factors.

Anemia is a cause of lack of libido in women due to the loss of iron during the period.

Smoking, alcohol use disorder, and the use of certain drugs can also lead to a decreased libido. Moreover, specialists suggest that several lifestyle changes such as exercising, quitting smoking, lowering consumption of alcohol or using prescription drugs may help increase one's sexual desire.

Medications 
Some people purposefully attempt to decrease their libido through the usage of anaphrodisiacs. Aphrodisiacs, such as dopaminergic psychostimulants, are a class of drugs which can increase libido. On the other hand, a reduced libido is also often iatrogenic and can be caused by many medications, such as hormonal contraception, SSRIs and other antidepressants, antipsychotics, opioids, beta blockers and Isotretinoin.

Isotretinoin, finasteride and many SSRIs uncommonly can cause a long-term decrease in libido and overall sexual function, sometimes lasting for months or years after users of these drugs have stopped taking them. These long-lasting effects have been classified as iatrogenic medical disorders, respectively termed post-retinoid sexual dysfunction/post-Accutane syndrome (PRSD/PAS), post-finasteride syndrome (PFS) and post-SSRI sexual dysfunction (PSSD). These three disorders share many overlapping symptoms in addition to reduced libido, and are thought to share a common etiology, but collectively remain poorly-understood and lack effective treatments.

Multiple studies have shown that with the exception of bupropion (Wellbutrin), trazodone (Desyrel) and nefazodone (Serzone), antidepressants generally will lead to lowered libido. SSRIs that typically lead to decreased libido are fluoxetine (Prozac), paroxetine (Paxil), fluvoxamine (Luvox), citalopram (Celexa) and sertraline (Zoloft). Some antidepressant users have tried decreasing their dosage in the hopes of maintaining an adequate sex drive. Other users try enrolling in psychotherapy to solve depression-related issues of libido. However, the effectiveness of this therapy is mixed, with many reporting that it had no or little effect on sexual drive.

Testosterone is one of the hormones controlling libido in human beings. Emerging research is showing that hormonal contraception methods like oral contraceptive pills (which rely on estrogen and progesterone together) are causing low libido in females by elevating levels of sex hormone-binding globulin (SHBG). SHBG binds to sex hormones, including testosterone, rendering them unavailable. Research is showing that even after ending a hormonal contraceptive method, SHBG levels remain elevated and no reliable data exists to predict when this phenomenon will diminish.

Oral contraceptives lower androgen levels in users, and lowered androgen levels generally lead to a decrease in sexual desire. However, usage of oral contraceptives has shown to typically not have a connection with lowered libido in women.

Effects of age 
Males reach the peak of their sex drive in their teenage years, while females reach it in their thirties. The surge in testosterone hits the male at puberty resulting in a sudden and extreme sex drive which reaches its peak at age 15–16, then drops slowly over his lifetime. In contrast, a female's libido increases slowly during adolescence and peaks in her mid-thirties.
Actual testosterone and estrogen levels that affect a person's sex drive vary considerably.

Some boys and girls will start expressing romantic or sexual interest by age 10–12. The romantic feelings are not necessarily sexual, but are more associated with attraction and desire for another. For boys and girls in their preteen years (ages 11–12), at least 25% report "thinking a lot about sex". By the early teenage years (ages 13–14), however, boys are much more likely to have sexual fantasies than girls. In addition, boys are much more likely to report an interest in sexual intercourse at this age than girls. Masturbation among youth is common, with prevalence among the population generally increasing until the late 20s and early 30s. Boys generally start masturbating earlier, with less than 10% boys masturbating around age 10, around half participating by age 11–12, and over a substantial majority by age 13–14. This is in sharp contrast to girls where virtually none are engaging in masturbation before age 13, and only around 20% by age 13–14.

People in their 60s and early 70s generally retain a healthy sex drive, but this may start to decline in the early to mid-70s. Older adults generally develop a reduced libido due to declining health and environmental or social factors. In contrast to common belief, postmenopausal women often report an increase in sexual desire and an increased willingness to satisfy their partner. Women often report family responsibilities, health, relationship problems, and well-being as inhibitors to their sexual desires. Aging adults often have more positive attitudes towards sex in older age due to being more relaxed about it, freedom from other responsibilities, and increased self-confidence. Those exhibiting negative attitudes generally cite health as one of the main reasons. Stereotypes about aging adults and sexuality often regard seniors as asexual beings, doing them no favors when they try to talk about sexual interest with caregivers and medical professionals. Non-western cultures often follow a narrative of older women having a much lower libido, thus not encouraging any sort of sexual behavior for women. Residence in retirement homes has affects on residents' libidos. In these homes, sex occurs, but it is not encouraged by the staff or other residents. Lack of privacy and resident gender imbalance are the main factors lowering desire. Generally, for older adults, being excited about sex, good health, sexual self-esteem and having a sexually talented partner can be factors.

Sexual desire disorders 

A sexual desire disorder is more common in women than in men, and women tend to exhibit less frequent and less intense sexual desires than men. Erectile dysfunction may happen to the penis because of lack of sexual desire, but these two should not be confused. For example, large recreational doses of amphetamine or methamphetamine can simultaneously cause erectile dysfunction and significantly increase libido. However, men can also experience a decrease in their libido as they age.

The American Medical Association has estimated that several million US women have a female sexual arousal disorder, though arousal is not at all synonymous with desire, so this finding is of limited relevance to the discussion of libido. Some specialists claim that women may experience low libido due to some hormonal abnormalities such as lack of luteinising hormone or androgenic hormones, although these theories are still controversial.

See also

References

Further reading 
 Ellenberger, Henri (1970). The Discovery of the Unconscious: The History and Evolution of Dynamic Psychiatry. New York: Basic Books. Hardcover , softcover .
 Froböse, Gabriele, and Froböse, Rolf. Lust and Love: Is It More than Chemistry? Michael Gross (trans. and ed.). Royal Society of Chemistry,  (2006)
 Giles, James, The Nature of Sexual Desire, Lanham, Maryland: University Press of America, 2008.

 
Carl Jung
Energy and instincts
Estrogens
Freudian psychology
Motivation
Philosophy of sexuality
Psychoanalytic terminology
Psychodynamics
Testosterone